The Philippine Merchant Marine Academy also referred to by its acronym PMMA) is a maritime higher education institution operated by the Philippine government in San Narciso, Zambales. Students are called midshipmen but are often also referred to as cadets. Upon graduation, students are commissioned as ensigns (second lieutenants) in the Philippine Navy Reserve and have the option to join the merchant marine, the Philippine Navy, or the Philippine Coast Guard.

Curriculum

The academy offers courses for Bachelor of Science degrees in marine transportation and marine engineering. Both are four-year residency courses consisting of three-years of academic studies (first, second, and fourth years). The one year apprentice training (third year) is aboard commercial vessels plying the international sea lanes as deck or engine room cadets. The academy also offers master's degree courses in shipping business management and maritime education.

The student body is referred to as the Corps of Midshipmen, and follows a rigid seniority system. Each year level is a "class." The fourth-year graduating students are called First Class Midshipmen (1CL), the third year is Second Class Midshipmen (2CL), the second year is Third Class Midshipmen (3CL) and the first year is the Fourth Class Midshipmen. The Fourth Class Midshipmen are also referred to as plebes or bugs, while the other classes are referred to as upperclassmen. Third Class Midshipmen are also called "Tiger of the Corps", while Second Class Midshipmen sails out of the seven seas around the world on different merchant marine vessels as per their compliance for a 1-year shipboard training aboard international/ocean-going vessels with their rank of Deck Cadet for BSMT Cadets and Engine Cadet for BSMarE Cadets. Lastly, the First Class Midshipmen are also called "King of The Barracks", "Dragon of the Corps" while they aspire to succeed in finishing their 3 years of being a cadet and a graduating class of their year.

Aspiring midshipmen must pass the  entrance examinations and rigorous medical and physical examinations before admission. For example, males must be at least five feet three inches tall, and females must be at least five feet one inch tall and never have given birth. A long list of diseases, including major orthodontic problems and wearing glasses, disqualify both sexes.
 Successful applicants report to the academy for orientation, a month-long period of indoctrination and training which begins in the approved academic calendar of the following academic year. Probationary Midshipmen or "probies" who pass this orientation & indoctrination trainings undertake an oath-taking ceremony at the end and are assigned serial numbers, given uniforms, and incorporated as Fourth Class Midshipmen.

The curriculum involves both academics and military-style leadership and  discipline, aimed at training marine officers to manage coastal and foreign trade, serve as shipping executives, port supervisors, and marine surveyors, and serve as naval officers in time of war or national emergency. The curriculum follows the guidelines of the 1995 STCW and the Policies, Standards and Guidelines for Maritime Education 1997 set by the Commission on Higher Education.

The PMMA is part of the Luzon Science Consortium.

Notable alumni
Lisandro Abadia, General, Chief of Staff AFP
Marcelo Azcárraga, Prime Minister of Spain
Román Basa, Katipunan Supreme Council president
Ponciano Bautista, Commodore PN, Korean War veteran
Reuben Doria, Commodore PCG
Manuel Earnshaw, Resident Commissioner of the Philippines
Herby Escutin, Admiral PCG
Joel Garcia, Admiral PCG, PCG Commandant
Dante Gonzaga, Commodore PN
Victor Jose, Commodore PN, veteran of  WWII, Korean and Vietnam Wars 
Pascual Ledesma, Director of the Navy
Juan Luna, artist and diplomatic agent
Carmelo Manzano, Commander USCGR, decorated WWII veteran
Rufino Martinez, Consul General
Rogelio Morales, PMMA Superintendent
Efigenio Navarro, Brigadier General PC
Gregorio Oca, founder of Maritime Academy of Asia and the Pacific
Ernesto Ogbinar, Rear Admiral, Flag Officer in Command PN
Jose Rancudo, Major General, Commanding General PAF
Hilario Ruiz, Rear Admiral, Flag Officer in Command PN
Margarito Sanchez, Rear Admiral PN
Robert Weilbacher, Micronesian politician

See also 
 Philippine Military Academy
 Philippine National Police Academy
 Cadet rank in the Philippines

References

External links
 
 Official Facebook Page

Universities and colleges in Zambales
State universities and colleges in the Philippines
Educational institutions established in 1820
Maritime colleges
Universities and colleges in Manila
Naval academies